The 1967 Formula One season was the 21st season of FIA Formula One motor racing. It featured the 1967 World Championship of Drivers and the 1967 International Cup for F1 Manufacturers, contested concurrently over an eleven race series which commenced on 2 January, and ended on 22 October. The season also included a number of non-championship races for Formula One cars. Denny Hulme won the World Championship of Drivers and Brabham-Repco was awarded the International Cup for F1 Manufacturers.

Season summary
At the Dutch Grand Prix, Lotus unveiled the new Ford-sponsored Cosworth DFV engine which was to be one of the outstanding racing engines of all time, winning 155 Grands Prix, Le Mans and Indianapolis. Although Jim Clark won four races, Denny Hulme took the title by virtue of his greater consistency. At Monza, Clark pitted to replace a tyre, made up a lap to retake the lead, only to run out of fuel on the last lap; a drive that confirmed his status as one of the all-time greats. Dan Gurney's Eagle won its only victory, and Pedro Rodríguez gave Cooper their last win in a dramatic South African Grand Prix in which John Love came close to victory in his outdated and privately entered Cooper-Climax.

Hulme became the first of two drivers to win the title without achieving a single pole position in the season. He is also the only New Zealander to win the World Championship of Drivers.

Two drivers died in Formula One related events in 1967. Ferrari driver Lorenzo Bandini died in a fiery accident during the Monaco Grand Prix on 10 May. While running second behind Hulme's Brabham BT20 on lap 82 (of 100), Bandini lost control of his Ferrari 312 when he clipped a guardrail going into the Harbour Chicane. He went into an erratic skid before hitting a light pole and overturning. When the Ferrari then hit the trackside straw bales its fuel tank exploded into flames with Bandini trapped underneath. Suffering burns to more than 70% of his body, Bandini died in hospital three days later. British driver Bob Anderson died on 27 August during a test at Silverstone driving a Brabham. Anderson slid off the track in wet conditions and hit a marshals post, suffering serious chest and neck injuries. He later died in the nearby Northampton General Hospital.

Season review

Teams and drivers
The following teams and drivers competed in the 1967 FIA World Championship.

 Pink background denotes F2 entrants to the German Grand Prix

World Drivers' Championship standings

Championship points were awarded on a 9–6–4–3–2–1 basis to the first six finishers in each round. Only the best five results from the first six races and the best four results from the last five races could be retained by each driver.

|}
1 – Ineligible for Formula One points, because they drove with Formula Two cars.

International Cup for F1 Manufacturers standings
Points were awarded on a 9–6–4–3–2–1 basis to the first six finishers at each round, however only the best placed car from each manufacturer was eligible to score points. Only the best five results from the first six rounds and the best four results from the last five rounds were retained.

Bold results counted to championship totals.

Non-championship races
Other Formula One races held in 1967, which did not count towards the World Championship.

Notes and references

External links
 Results and images from the 1967 World Championship at f1-facts.com
 Official Program covers from the 1967 World Championship at www.f1-geschiedenis.be

Formula One seasons